Birmingham Edgbaston by-election may refer to one of three Parliamentary by-elections held for the British House of Commons constituency of Birmingham Edgbaston:

 1940 Birmingham Edgbaston by-election
 1953 Birmingham Edgbaston by-election

See also
Birmingham Edgbaston (UK Parliament constituency)